But Beautiful may refer to:
"But Beautiful" (song), 1947 popular song by Johnny Burke and Jimmy Van Heusen
But Beautiful (Bing Crosby album) (1962), Bing Crosby compilation album
But Beautiful: A Book About Jazz, 1991 book by Geoff Dyer
But Beautiful (Nancy Wilson album), 1969 album by Nancy Wilson
But Beautiful, 1992 album by the Jimmy Raney Trio with George Mraz and Lewis Nash
But Beautiful (Stan Getz & Bill Evans album), 1996 album, recorded in 1974 by Stan Getz & Bill Evans
But Beautiful (Boz Scaggs album), 2003 album of jazz standards by Boz Scaggs